Digvijaya, (Sanskrit: दिग्विजय; Dig:"Direction" and Vijaya:"Victory"), in India was originally a Sanskrit term that meant conquest of the "four quarters", in a military or a moral context. In medieval times, it came to refer to the religious conquest by reputed founders of the major Hindu renunciate traditions, namely Madhva, Sankara, Chaitanya, and Vallabha.

Military and moral conquest
Digvijaya as a military conquest is often mentioned in Indian history and mythology, for example, the digvijaya of Bharata Chakravartin. It was followed by rituals confirming the divine grace and royal authority of the conqueror. With his conquest, the Chakravartin unified India as a "moral kingdom" governed by a higher order.  The Buddhist Digha Nikaya (Chapter 26.6-7), also talks about a wheel-turning monarch (Cakravartin), who propagates Dharma in the four corners under his rulership.

Religious conquest
According to Sax, the religious connotation to the term digvijaya may have emerged as a response to the decline of the royal digvijaya, consequent to the Muslim conquest  of most of India.

Madhva Digvijayam
Sumadhva Vijaya, ("The story of the victory of Madhva,") also referred as Sri Madhva Vijaya, (or simply as Madhva Vijaya), is a 14th century hagiographical work of the Dvaita philosopher Sri Madhvacharya. It was composed by Sri Narayana Panditacharya, who was the son of Sri Trivikrama Panditacharya, a direct disciple of Madhvacharya and a famous Advaita exponent before his conversion to the Madhva faith.

Sumadhva Vijaya is a Mahakavya, ('great poem'), a specific Sanskrit literary genre, containing sixteen "sargas" or cantos. It starts with a description of the first two Avatars of Vayu, namely Hanuman and Bhima. It then proceeds to describe the life of Sri Madhva, who is considered the third avatar, giving detailed descriptions of various incidents of Sri Madhva's life.

Several commentaries have been written on it, including one written by Sri Narayana Panditacharya, called Bhava Prakashika. The next oldest commentary  on Sumadhva Vijaya is by Sri Vedanga Tirtha, called Padartha Dipika. Another relevant commentary is the Padartha Dipikodbodhika by Sri Vishwapati Tirtha of Pejawara Matha. "Mandopakarini" of Sri Chalari Sheshacharya is also quite popular

Shankara Digvijayam
Shankara Vijayams (IAST ) are traditional hagiographies of the Advaita Vedanta exegete Adi Shankara, describing his 'conquest of the four quarters'. In these hagiographies, Shankara is deified as a ruler-renunciate, bringing harmony to the four quarters. The genre may have been modelled on the digvijayas of Madhva, since the oldest Shankara-hagiography post-dates Madhva (1238-1317). The Shankara-digvijayams mimick the royal digvijayams, as his 'conquest of the four quarters' and the establishment of his kingdom is followed by his coronation with this ascent of the Throne of Omniscience (sarvajña-pīṭha), akin to the rajasuya rites.

The main Shankaravijayams are:
 Anandagirīya Shankaravijayam (of Anandagiri, not extant)
 Anantanadagiri Shankaravijayam (extant from 15th century, but controversial in nature)
 Cidvilāsīya Shankaravijayam (of Chidvilasa, c. between 15th century and 17th century
 Keralīya Shankaravijayam (extant in Kerala, c. 17th century)
 Madhavīya Shankara (Dig)vijayam (of Madhava). Usually attributed to Madhava-Vidyaranya, and dated to the 14th century. The attribution and dating is disputed; the author was a Madhavi, and the correct date seems to be the 17th or even 18th century.

See also
 Shiva Digvijaya

Notes

References

Sources

External links
Madhva
 Discourse on Sumadhva Vijaya (Kannada) by Vidwan Vyasanakere Prabhanjanacharya.
 Biographical links to Madhvacharya and other dvaita resources 
 Madhva and other Dvaita saints text resource 
 Complete Biography of Sriman Madhvacharya 
 
 Madhwa Vijaya Audio

Shankara
The Sankaravijaya Literature—  a detailed discussion of the various Shankara Vijayams

Hinduism